Aujac may refer to:

 Aujac, Charente-Maritime, a French commune
 Aujac, Gard, a French commune
 Associació d'Usuaris de Java de Catalunya